Hans-Peter Hasenfratz (22 February 1938 – 15 December 2016) was a Swiss religious scholar who was Professor of Religious Studies at the Ruhr University Bochum. He was a leading authority on the phenomenology of religion and Germanic paganism.

Biography
Hans-Peter Hasenfratz was born in Zürich on 22 February 1938. Hasenfratz studied at Evangelical Theology at the University of Zurich, where Eduard Schweizer was his foremost teacher. He received his Ph.D. in 1974. His thesis, which was on the phenomenology of religion, is considered to have been of groundbreaking nature in the field. From 1985 to 2003, Hasenfratz was Professor of Religious Studies at the Ruhr University Bochum. Hasenfratz was considered a leading authority on Germanic paganism, on which he wrote widely.

Selected works
 Die religiöse Welt der Germanen, 1994
 Der Tod in der Welt der Religionen, 2009
 Barbarian Rites: The Spiritual World of the Vikings and the Germanic Tribes, 2011

References

Sources

 

1938 births
2016 deaths
Germanic studies scholars
University of Zurich alumni
Academic staff of Ruhr University Bochum
Swiss expatriates in Germany
Swiss religion academics
Writers on Germanic paganism